The West, Christians and Jews in Saudi Arabian Schoolbooks is a January 2003 publication by the Institute for Monitoring Peace and Cultural Tolerance in School Education (IMPACT-SE), which was known as CMIP at the time of publication. The publication analyzes how Saudi Arabian school textbooks portray the West, Christians, and Jews.

See also
 Saudi-Arabian textbook controversy

References

External links
 
 A Textbook Case of Intolerance: Changing the world one schoolbook at a time by Anne Applebaum

2003 non-fiction books